The 2012 Korean FA Cup, known as the 2012 Hana Bank FA Cup, was the 17th edition of the Korean FA Cup. Pohang Steelers became champions and qualified for the 2013 AFC Champions League.

Schedule

Teams

Qualifying rounds 
The first round was held on 17–18 March 2012, and the second round on 28–29 April 2012.

First round 
The draw for the first round was held on 22 February 2012.

Second round
The draw for the second round was held on 28 March 2012.

Final rounds

Bracket

Round of 32
The draw for the round of 32 was held on 3 May 2012.

Round of 16
The draw for the round of 16 was held on 31 May 2012.

Quarter-finals
The draw for the quarterfinals was held on 2 July 2012.

Semi-finals
The draw for the semifinals was held on 6 August 2012.

Final

Awards

Main awards
No Byung-jun scored the most goals among all participants with 3 goals, but only the top goalscorer with 4 or more goals could qualify for the top goalscorer award under the rule of the KFA.

Man of the Round

See also
2012 in South Korean football
2012 K League
2012 Korea National League
2012 Challengers League
2012 U-League

References

External links
Official website
Fixtures & Results at KFA

Korean FA Cup seasons
2012 in South Korean football